List of ships built by Aberdeen shipbuilders Hall, Russell & Company, from yard number 801 to 900.

The ships built in the sequence 601 to 800 cover the period 1947 — 1962.

One vessel built during this period by Hall, Russell & Company has become well known in popular culture, a fisheries research vessel built as Sir William Hardy (Yard number 846) was bought by Greenpeace, becoming the first Rainbow Warrior in 1977. The Rainbow Warrior would later be sunk by French Special Forces when it was used to disrupt French nuclear weapons testing in the Pacific.

Notes

 Yard Numbers 816, 817 unused, likely cancelled.
 Yard Number 843 unused, likely cancelled.
 Yard Numbers 850, 851 unused, likely cancelled.
 Yard Number 873 unused, likely cancelled.
 Yard Number 876 unused, likely cancelled.
 Yard Number 895 cancelled in 1961.

References

Bibliography

Ships built in Scotland